Carlos Alves may refer to:

 Carlos Zingaro (born 1948), Portuguese violinist
 Carlos Santana (Carlos Augusto Alves Santana, born 1947), American musician
 Carlos Alberto Alves Garcia (born 1982), Portuguese footballer playing in Switzerland
 Carlos Alves Júnior (1903–1978), Portuguese international footballer
 Carlos Alves, Angolan football striker in the 80s, for Primeiro de Agosto
 Carlos Alves (footballer, born 1988), Portuguese professional footballer